is a former Japanese politician and finance bureaucrat and a former governor of Kagawa Prefecture in the Shikoku region of Japan. He held office for three terms, from September 2010 to September 2022.

References

External links
  

1952 births
Living people
Politicians from Kagawa Prefecture
University of Tokyo alumni
Governors of Kagawa Prefecture